Laila Soueif (born 1956) is an Egyptian human and women's rights activist, a mathematician and professor at Cairo University. Al Jazeera has called her "an Egyptian revolutionary". She is the widow of fellow activist Ahmed Seif El-Islam, and all three of their children are noted activists: Alaa Abd El-Fattah, Sanaa Seif, and Mona Seif. Her sister is the novelist Ahdaf Soueif.

Early life
Soueif was born in 1956, the daughter of university professors. She went to her first political protest in 1972 in Cairo's Tahrir Square, when she was just 16. Two hours later her parents tracked her down and brought her home, "From that, I learned that it was easier to defy the state than to defy my parents".

Soueif studied mathematics at Cairo University in the mid-1970s.

Career
Soueif is a professor of mathematics at Cairo University.

Soueif is the founder of the 9 March Professors' Movement for Universities Independence.

In November 2014, Soueif and her daughter Mona Seif ended a 76-day hunger strike, protesting against the imprisonment of her son Alaa Abd El-Fattah, but El-Fattah and his sister Sanaa Seif reportedly remained on hunger strike.

Personal life
Soueif met her future husband, Ahmed Seif El-Islam, while at Cairo University in the mid-1970s, where he was already the "leader of an underground communist student cell calling for revolution". He became a left-wing human rights activist and lawyer, and they were married until his death in 2014.

They are the parents of the activists Alaa Abd El-Fattah, Sanaa Seif and Mona Seif. Her sister is the novelist Ahdaf Soueif.

References

External links

1956 births
Living people
Egyptian activists
Egyptian women activists
Egyptian feminists
Cairo University alumni
Academic staff of Cairo University
20th-century Egyptian mathematicians
Women mathematicians
Egyptian human rights activists
Egyptian revolutionaries
Female revolutionaries
21st-century Egyptian mathematicians